Agaton Sax and the Diamond Thieves (published in English in 1965) is a book about detective Agaton Sax by Swedish author Nils-Olof Franzen. It was the first of the series to be published in English.

Plot summary
The Koh-Mi-Nor diamond is stolen and a very clever thief is putting messages about it, in a secret code, in the personal column of the newspaper published by the Swedish detective Agaton Sax.

References

1959 Swedish novels
1959 children's books
Swedish children's novels
Children's mystery novels
Swedish mystery novels